Jalan Lapangan Terbang Baru, Federal Routes 900A, 900B and 900C, is a major highway in Kuching city, Sarawak, Malaysia

List of interchanges 

Highways in Malaysia
Malaysian Federal Roads